Mian Muhammad Amin Khan Turani  (died 28 January 1721), was the Grand Vizier of the Mughal Empire during the reign of the Mughal Emperor Muhammad Shah. He served the office for four months. He is known to have served the Mughal Emperor Aurangzeb during his early years.

Turani, was troubled by the rise of the Sayyid Brothers and helped overthrow them in the year 1720. After his death Chin Qilich Khan was appointed Grand Vizier of the Mughal Empire.

Family
He was a cousin of Kilich Khan Bahadur. His nephew was Nizam-ul-Mulk, founder of the Asaf Jahi dynasty. His sister was married to Abd al-Samad Khan, the governor of Lahore.

His son Qamar-ud-Din was himself later appointed Grand Vizier and was killed during the Battle of Manupur in 1748 against the forces of Ahmad Shah Durrani. His daughter was married to Zakariya Khan, subedar of the provinces of Lahore and Multan.

References

1721 deaths
18th-century Indian monarchs
Grand viziers of the Mughal Empire
18th-century Indian Muslims
Year of birth missing